Dutch Standards are environmental pollutant reference values (i.e., concentrations in environmental medium) used in environmental remediation, investigation and cleanup.

Barring a few exceptions, the target values are underpinned by an environmental risk analysis wherever possible and apply to individual substances. In most cases, target values for the various substances are related to a national background concentration that was determined for the Netherlands.

Groundwater target values provide an indication of the benchmark for environmental quality in the long term, assuming that there are negligible risks for the ecosystem. For metals a distinction is made between deep and shallow groundwater. This is because deep and shallow groundwater contain different background concentrations. An arbitrary limit of 10 metres has been adopted. The target values shown below are for 'shallow' groundwater, 0 – 10 m depth.

The soil remediation intervention values indicate when the functional properties of the soil for humans, plants and animals is seriously impaired or threatened. They are representative of the
level of contamination above which a serious case of soil contamination is deemed to exist. The target values for soil are adjusted for the organic matter (humus) content and soil fraction <0.2 µm (Lutum - Latin, meaning "mud" or "clay"). The values below are calculated for a 'Standard Soil' with 10% organic matter and 25% lutum.

A case of environmental contamination is defined as 'serious' if >25 m³ soil or >100 m³ groundwater is contaminated above the intervention value.

The values presented below are from Annex 1, Table 1, "Groundwater target values and soil and groundwater intervention values". In previous versions of the Dutch Standards, target values for soil were also present. However, in the 2009 version, target values for soils have been deleted for all compounds except metals.

References

Environment of the Netherlands
Environmental standards
Pollution